The Cheshire Bowl is an annual rugby union knock-out club competition organized by the Cheshire Rugby Football Union, and was introduced during the 2009–10 season with Winnington Park being the first ever winners.  The Bowl is currently a stand-alone competition that is open to club sides based in Cheshire, Merseyside or the Isle of Man that are ranked at tier 8 (South Lancs/Cheshire 2) of the English league system - although some teams may be invited from outside the official leagues.  It is the third most important competition organized by the Cheshire RFU behind the Cheshire Vase (2nd) and Cheshire Cup (1st).

The present format is as a knock-out cup with a semi-final and final which is held at a neutral venue during the latter stages of the season (March–May). At present Cheshire Bowl finals are held at the same date and venue as the Cheshire Vase final.

Cheshire Bowl winners

Number of wins
Winnington Park (3)
Hoylake (2)
Bowdon (1)
Sale (1)
Southern Nomads (1)
Crewe & Nantwich (1)

See also
 Cheshire RFU
 Cheshire Cup
 Cheshire Vase
 Cheshire Plate
 English rugby union system
 Rugby union in England

References

External links
Cheshire RFU

Recurring sporting events established in 2009
2009 establishments in England
Rugby union cup competitions in England
Rugby union in Cheshire